William Oliver Rose (February 10, 1871 – March 4, 1936) was an educator, physician and political figure in British Columbia. He represented Nelson in the Legislative Assembly of British Columbia from 1916 to 1924 as a Conservative.

Biography 
Born in Lakesville, Prince Edward Island, the son of William Rose and Jane Baker, he taught school there and in Manitoba before studying medicine at McGill University. He graduated in 1898 and served at the Royal Victoria Hospital, later moving to Nelson, British Columbia. Rose served as alderman and mayor for Nelson. In 1921, he ran unsuccessfully for a seat in the Canadian House of Commons in the riding of Kootenay West.

Rose married Azza Jean Brownell on August 28, 1901.

He died in Nelson on March 4, 1936.

References 

1871 births
1936 deaths
British Columbia Conservative Party MLAs
Mayors of places in British Columbia